Body on Me may refer to:
"Body on Me" (Nelly song), 2008
"Body on Me" (Rita Ora song), 2015